Skagit Island Marine State Park is a public recreation area comprising  Skagit Island in Skagit County, Washington. The island is wooded with occasional meadows, rock outcrops, beach, and a land trail.

References

External links
Skagit Island Marine State Park Washington State Parks and Recreation Commission

Parks in Skagit County, Washington
State parks of Washington (state)